Quercus elliptica is a Mesoamerican species of oak tree. It is widespread across central and southern Mexico and Central America from Sinaloa and Hidalgo south as far as Nicaragua. It is classified in Quercus sect. Lobatae.

Description

Habitat and range
Quercus elliptica is found in oak forests, cloud forests, and pine–fir (Abies) forests from 300 to 2400 meters elevation. It is mostly restricted to granite soils. Quercus elliptica is often dominant and common where it is found.

Quercus elliptica ranges across central and southern Mexico. Its range extends from the central Sierra Madre Occidental of Sinaloa in the northwest through western Nayarit, including Sierra de San Juan, and western Jalisco, including the Sierra de Vallejo and Sierra de Manantlán. It also ranges through the Sierra Madre del Sur and Sierra Madre de Oaxaca of Guerrero and Oaxaca states. There are populations in the Trans-Mexican Volcanic Belt of Michoacán and Mexico states. In Chiapas it is found in the Sierra Madre de Chiapas and Chiapas Highlands, including Lagunas de Montebello National Park.

There are only two citations in Guatemala, in the Sierra de las Minas and in Camotán. It is also found in the Maya Mountains of Belize, and in the highlands of El Salvador, Honduras, and Nicaragua.

Conservation
Because of its wide range and abundant populations it is rated Least Concern. Despite habitat loss in parts of its range its population is considered stable.

Phytophthora cinnamomi, the fungal parasite known as Sudden Oak Death, has been found in Quercus elliptica.

References

External links
 photo of herbarium specimen at Missouri Botanical Garden, collected in Honduras in 1938

elliptica
Oaks of Mexico
Plants described in 1801
Flora of Central America
Flora of the Sierra Madre Occidental
Flora of the Sierra Madre del Sur
Flora of the Sierra Madre de Oaxaca
Flora of the Trans-Mexican Volcanic Belt
Sierra Madre de Chiapas
Chiapas montane forests
Central American pine–oak forests
Flora of the Central American montane forests
Cloud forest flora of Mexico